Sir Rowland Hirst Barran (7 August 1858 – 6 August 1949) was a British Liberal Party politician and Member of Parliament.

Biography
Rowland Barran was born in 1858, the youngest son of Sir John Barran, a pioneer in clothing manufacture and Member of Parliament for Leeds and Otley.

Following the death of  Frances Lupton in 1892, Rowland lived near Leeds  at Frances's Beechwood Estate  which had been entailed to  her eldest son and fellow Liberal politician, Francis Martineau Lupton. Barran remained at  Beechwood until Francis Martineau's death in 1921. Lupton and his family also owned the Newton Park Estate (North  Leeds), the constituency of which  Barran was M.P. from 1902 -1918.

Barran bred Shorthorn livestock during his  residency at Beechwood.

Barran became chairman of the family firm in 1918, succeeding his brother, Charles, who had succeeded their father in this post in 1903.

He was a member of the Leeds City Council alongside Alderman Francis Martineau Lupton, and served on the Leeds School Board before his election to parliament.

He was elected to the Parliament for Leeds North in a by-election on 29 July 1902 (caused by the elevation of William Jackson to the peerage), and served until the General Election of 14 December 1918. He was knighted in 1917.

During the course of World War I, Barran indicated he would stand down at the next election, probably to concentrate more on his business interests. In 1918, he became chairman of the family firm of clothing manufacturers, taking over that position from his brother.

Family
Barran married Rose Cardew Bradley. They had the following children:

 Rose Sylvia Barran
 Gwendoline Cardew Barran
 Captain Rowland Noel Barran (25 December 1887 - died 19 March 1919)
 Captain Hugh Bradley Barran (13 May 1889 - 19 May 1975)

References

External links 
 

1858 births
1949 deaths
Knights Bachelor
Younger sons of baronets
Liberal Party (UK) MPs for English constituencies
UK MPs 1900–1906
UK MPs 1906–1910
UK MPs 1910
UK MPs 1910–1918